Jan Neruda Grammar School is a Czech public secondary school situated in Prague. It is named after the writer, Jan Neruda.

The school ranks as the second best secondary (high) school, and the best public secondary school in the Czech Republic according to the Czech Ministry of Education, based on the performance of students/graduates at the Maturita (A-level equivalent).

Description 
The grammar school is located on Hellichova Street in Prague. Jan Neruda Grammar School offers two courses of study: bilingual (French-Czech) and general (there used to be two general courses, science and humanities, although the difference between the two courses was marginal compared to the Anglo-Saxon education system; recently, these two courses have been merged). In the first and second years bilingual-course students are taught in Czech, but from the third year most subjects (apart from languages, fine arts and sports) are taught in French. It takes 6 years to complete the Grammar school. The staff of the Grammar school consists of about 65 teachers. Between 1996 and 2012 the school offered also a separate course consisting of general subjects and extensive music lessons for musically talented students in a different building located on Komenského Square (nowadays an unrelated institution with its own headmaster).
The Grammar school is a member of the ASPnet UNESCO network. The school building is barrier-free.

Subjects and activities 
The structure of the course reflects the Czech national curriculum and consists of following subjects:

Compulsory subjects:

 Czech – Czech and world literature, Czech writing, Czech grammar
 English
 German
 French
 Mathematics
 Physics
 Chemistry
 Biology/Geology
 History – Czech and world history, including modern history
 Social sciences – psychology, philosophy, sociology, political science, law, economics
 Geography
 IT
 Latin/Descriptive geometry
 Music – singing, playing instruments, history of music, theory
 Arts – creative lessons
 Physical education
 Media education – an integrated subject, no separate lessons

Various elective and optional subjects, e.g.:

 Literature seminar
 Humanities
 Biology seminar
 History seminar
 Chemistry seminar
 History of arts

The school offers many activities for students: sports (weekly training sessions of various sports, regular weekend or week-long courses – skiing, canoeing, cycling, climbing, ski mountaineering, windsurfing, cross-country skiing etc.), languages (Spanish, Russian, Japanese), photography course, drama course, choir, discussion club, EYP and UN delegations, excursions (history, arts, technical, biology, psychology/psychiatry, law, charities), group psychology sessions, competitions (mathematics, cipher challenge, physics, astronomy, music, discussion, poetry reciting, presenting, chess, Latin, French conversation), lectures, cultural events (theatre, cinema, classical music concerts), virtual company trade fair (business-presenatation skills, second year students), reduced-price theatre tickets, student-run festivals and events, and many other projects, pop-up events and activities.

The school has an extended network of foreign schools (France, Belgium, Germany, Switzerland, Britain) and students are expected to participate in student exchanges that are provided every year.

The school organises a skiing course for students in their second year (Czech national curriculum), a teambuilding course for the first-year students, a skiing-language course in the third year, and a canoeing or cycling/climbing course in the fourth year. These courses are a fixed part of the school year.

The school and its students contribute to several charity organisations.

Administration 
The current headmaster is  PhDr. Zuzana Wienerová , she has an assistant headmaster, RNDr. Jaromír Kekule, Ph.D and Mgr. Štěpán Mička.

History 
Jan Neruda Grammar School is one of the oldest grammar schools in the Czech Republic. It was founded in 1865, although not in the contemporary building which has been occupied since 1876. The original name of the school was Malostranské gymnázium (Malá Strana Grammar School).

Graduates of note 
Among hundreds of well known graduates of the school there are:

 Bohumil Bydžovský – academic
 Bohuslava Kecková – the first Czech female doctor
 Jaromír Hanzlík – actor
 Jan Patočka – professor and philosopher
 Jiří Paroubek – a former Czech Prime Minister and prominent politician
 Jiří Šedivý – Defence Minister
 Radim Palouš – professor
 Jan Tříska – actor
 Vladislav Vančura – writer

References

External links
 http://www.gjn.cz/
 

Schools in Prague
Educational institutions established in 1865
Malá Strana
1865 establishments in the Austrian Empire